Maihuenia patagonica, commonly known locally as chupas sangre or siempre verde, is a succulent cactus shrub native to Chile and Argentina. Maihuenia patagonica is remarkably tolerant to moisture and cold temperatures.

Description
It blooms white to violet flowers.

References

Maihuenioideae
Flora of Chile
Flora of Argentina